= Okhposu railway station =

Railway station in Yangon, Myanmar

Coordinates: 16°46′09″N 96°15′31″E

Okhposu railway station is a railway station in Yangon, Myanmar.
